Trnávka is name of several locations in Central Europe:

Czech Republic
 Trnávka (Nový Jičín District), a village in Nový Jičín District
 Trnávka (Pardubice District), a village in Pardubice District
 Městečko Trnávka, a village in Svitavy District

Slovakia
 Trnávka (Bratislava), part of Ružinov, a borough of Bratislava, the capital of Slovakia
 Trnávka, Dunajská Streda District, a village in the Trnava Region (Dunajská Streda District) of Slovakia
 Trnávka, Trebišov District, a village in the Košice Region (Trebišov District) of Slovakia